Gol Cheshmeh Culture and Technology Centre ( – Kesht va Sanʿat Gol Cheshmeh) is a village and industrial centre in Nezamabad Rural District, in the Central District of Azadshahr County, Golestan Province, Iran. At the 2006 census, its population was 62, in 16 families.

References 

Populated places in Azadshahr County